Ashfaq Ali Khan is an Indian politician and a member of the  16th Legislative Assembly of Uttar Pradesh of India. He represents the Naugawan Sadat constituency of  Uttar Pradesh and now he is a member of the RLD political party.

Early life and education

Ashfaq Ali Khan was born in  Sihali Jageer, Uttar Pradesh. He attended Lucknow university  and attained Bachelor of Laws  degree.

Political career
Ashfaq Ali Khan has been a  MLA for one term. He  represented the Naugawan Sadat  constituency and was a member of the Samajwadi Party political  party. He lost the election in 17th Assembly Election in Uttar Pradesh from Rashtriya Lok Dal ticket.

Posts held

See also
Naugawan Sadat
Sixteenth Legislative Assembly of Uttar Pradesh
Uttar Pradesh Legislative Assembly

References 

Samajwadi Party politicians
Uttar Pradesh MLAs 2012–2017
People from Amroha district
1968 births
Living people
Rashtriya Lok Dal politicians